Juventus Manica, usually known simply as Juventus Manica, is a traditional football (soccer) club based in Manico, Mozambique.

Stadium
The club plays their home matches at Gaparinu des Manica, which has a maximum capacity of 10,000 people.

References

Manica Province
Football clubs in Mozambique